Great Britain and Northern Ireland competed at the 2022 European Athletics Championships in Munich, Germany, between 15 and 21 August 2022

Medallists

Results

Great Britain entered the following athletes.

Men

Track & road events

Field Events

Women

Track & road events

Field Events

Combined events – Heptathlon

Key
Q = Qualified for the next round
q = Qualified for the next round as a fastest loser or, in field events, by position without achieving the qualifying target
N/A = Round not applicable for the event
Bye = Athlete not required to compete in round

References

External links
European Athletics Championships

Nations at the 2022 European Athletics Championships
European Athletics Championships
2022